Hamani Diori (6 June 1916 – 23 April 1989) was the first President of the Republic of Niger. He was appointed to that office in 1960, when Niger gained independence. Although corruption was a common feature of his administration, he gained international respect for his role as a spokesman for African affairs and as a popular arbitrator in conflicts. His rule ended with a coup in 1974.

Early life 
Born in Soudouré, near the capital, Niamey, Diori was the son of a public health officer in the French colonial administration. He attended William Ponty Teachers' Training College in Dakar, Senegal, and worked as a teacher in Niger from 1936 to 1938, then became a Hausa and Djerma foreign language instructor at the Institute of Study Abroad, in Paris.

Independence activism
In 1946, while working as the headmaster of a school in Niger’s capital city of Niamey, he became one of the founders of the Nigerien Progressive Party (PPN), a regional branch of the African Democratic Rally (RDA). Later that year, he was elected to the French National Assembly. In the 1951 election, Diori was defeated by his cousin and political rival Djibo Bakary. He was again elected to the assembly in 1956, and was chosen deputy-speaker.

In 1958, after a referendum that granted Niger self-government, Diori became president of the provisional government. He then became Prime Minister of the republic in 1959.

Presidency

Niger gained independence from France on 3 August 1960 and Diori was elected president by the country's national assembly in November 1960. Organizing a powerful coalition of Hausa, Fula, and (most prominently) Djerma leaders, including chiefs and traditionalists, in support of Niger’s independence referendum, Diori gained French favor.

Soon after independence, Diori made the PPN to be the only legally permitted party.  His government favored the maintenance of traditional social structures and the retention of close economic ties with France. From the early 1960s, he ruled through a small number of pre-independence figures who sat on the PPN Politburo and largely bypassed even the cabinet.  In addition to being both president of the republic and president of the PPN, Diori directly led a number of Ministries.  From 1960 to 1963 he served as his own defence minister and foreign minister, and again took over the Foreign Ministry from 1965 to 1967. Most prominent, and perhaps most powerful, among Diori's advisers was writer and President of the National Assembly of Niger, Boubou Hama, who one writer has called the "eminence grise" behind Diori's rule. The National Assembly of Niger met in largely ceremonial yearly sittings to ratify government positions.  Traditional notables, elected as parliamentary representatives, often unanimously endorsed government proposals.  As president of the PPN, Diori was the only candidate for president of the republic, and as such was re-elected unopposed in 1965 and 1970.

He gained worldwide respect for his role as a spokesman for African affairs and as a popular arbitrator in conflicts involving other African nations. Domestically, however, his administration was rife with corruption, and the government was unable to implement much-needed reforms or to alleviate the widespread famine brought on by the Sahelian drought of the early 1970s. Increasingly criticized at home for his negligence in domestic matters, Diori put down a coup in December 1963, which occurred concurrently with a border dispute with the Republic of Dahomey. He also narrowly escaped assassination in 1965. Faced with an attempted military coup and attacks by members of Sawaba, he used French advisers and troops to strengthen his rule. Close links with France lead to student and union protests against what they described as "French neocolonialism". However, his relationship with France suffered when his government voiced dissatisfaction with the level of investment in uranium production when Georges Pompidou visited Niger in 1972.

Unrest and fall
Widespread civil disorder followed allegations that some government ministers were misappropriating stocks of food aid and accused Diori of consolidating power. Diori limited cabinet appointments to fellow Djerma, family members, and close friends. In addition, he acquired new powers by declaring himself the minister of foreign and defense affairs.  On 15 April 1974, Lieutenant colonel Seyni Kountché led a military coup that ended Diori's rule. He was imprisoned for six years. After his release in 1980, he remained under house arrest until 1987.

After being released from house arrest, he moved to Morocco, where he died on 23 April 1989 at the age of 72.

References

Further reading

Appiah, Kwame Anthony & Gates Jr, Henry Louis: Africana: The Encyclopedia of the African and African American Experience: Basic Civitas Books: New York: 1999
André Salifou. Hamani Diori. pp. 67–97 in La francophonie des "Pères fondateurs", Papa Alioune Ndao (ed.). Paris: KARTHALA Editions, (2008)  
 page on the French National Assembly website

1916 births
1989 deaths
People from Niamey
People of French West Africa
Nigerien Muslims
Nigerien Progressive Party – African Democratic Rally politicians
Presidents of Niger
Prime Ministers of Niger
Foreign ministers of Niger
Deputies of the 1st National Assembly of the French Fourth Republic
Deputies of the 3rd National Assembly of the French Fourth Republic
Deputies of the 1st National Assembly of the French Fifth Republic
Leaders ousted by a coup
Nigerien prisoners and detainees
Prisoners and detainees of Niger
Nigerien expatriates in Morocco
Nigerien independence activists
Zarma people
Heads of government who were later imprisoned